During the 2010–11 season, the Edinburgh Rugby team came 8th out of the 12 teams in the PRO12 league, and played in the pool stage of the Heineken Cup.

Squad list

PRO12 League table

Heineken Cup

Pool stage

References 

2010–11 in Scottish rugby union
2010-11
2010–11 Celtic League by team
2010–11 Heineken Cup by team